The May Bumps 2022 was a series of rowing races at Cambridge University from Wednesday 15 June 2022 to Saturday 18 June 2022. The event was run as a bumps race and was the 129th set of races in the series of May Bumps which have been held annually in mid-June in this form since 1887.

Following the cancellation of the 2020 and 2021 editions, this was the first time the May Bumps had been raced since three years prior in 2019.

Head of the River crews
  men rowed over on all four nights of the competition to retain the headship they won in 2019.

  decisively retained their 2019 headship by rowing over on all four nights.

Highest 2nd VIIIs

 Combined with three row-overs,  bumped  on the second night to finish 4th in the second division.

Links to races in other years
{| class="wikitable" style="margin-left: auto; margin-right: auto; border: none;"
! width=150 | Preceding year
! width=150 | Current year
! width=150 | Following year
|-
| May Bumps 2021 (cancelled) || May Bumps 2022 || May Bumps 2023|-
| Lent Bumps 2021 (cancelled) || Lent Bumps 2022 || Lent Bumps 2023
|-
|}

Bumps Charts

Below are the bumps charts for all 5 men's and all 5 women's divisions, with the men's event on the left and women's event on the right. The bumps chart shows the progress of every crew over all four days of the racing. To follow the progress of any particular crew, find the crew's name on the left side of the chart and follow the line to the end-of-the-week finishing position on the right of the chart.This chart may not be displayed correctly if you are using a large font size on your browser. A simple way to check is to see that the first horizontal bold line, marking the boundary between divisions, lies between positions 17 and 18.''

References 

2022 in rowing
May Bumps results
2022 in English sport